Elias of Jerusalem (d. c. 518) was a bishop and Patriarch of Jerusalem from 494 until he was deposed by Byzantine Emperor Anastasius I in 516 for supporting the decrees of the Council of Chalcedon. Elias was an Arab, by birth, who had been educated in a monastery in Egypt. At the Synod of Sidon (512) he successfully defended, together with Flavian II of Antioch, the dyophysite Christological doctrine proclaimed by the Council of Chalcedon.

See also
Patriarch Euphemius of Constantinople
Patriarch Timothy I of Constantinople

References

Elias I of Jerusalem
516 deaths
5th-century patriarchs of Jerusalem
5th-century Christian saints
6th-century Christian saints
Year of birth unknown
Saints from the Holy Land
5th-century Arabs
6th-century Arabs
Arab Christians